The 2015 Colonial Athletic Association baseball tournament was held at CofC Baseball Stadium at Patriot's Point in Mount Pleasant, South Carolina, from May 20 through 23.  It consisted of the top 6 finishers in the CAA in a double-elimination tournament.   won their 4th championship and earned the Colonial Athletic Association's automatic bid to the 2015 NCAA Division I baseball tournament.

Entering the event, UNC Wilmington had won the most championships among active teams, with three.  James Madison had claimed two titles, while William & Mary, Towson, and second-year member College of Charleston each had one.  Former member East Carolina won 7 titles during their tenure in the conference.

Seeding and format
Continuing the format adopted in 2012, the top six finishers from the regular season will compete in the double-elimination tournament.  The top two teams received a single bye and played the winners of the opening round games.

Bracket

All-Tournament team
The following players were named to the All-Tournament Team.

Most Valuable Player
Corey Dick was named Tournament Most Valuable Player.  Dick was a first baseman for UNC Wilmington, who went 3 for 5 in the Championship Game with a pair of doubles and two RBI.

References

Tournament
Colonial Athletic Association Baseball Tournament
Colonial Athletic Association baseball tournament
Colonial Athletic Association baseball tournament
College baseball tournaments in South Carolina
Mount Pleasant, South Carolina